Rtf1, Paf1/RNA polymerase II complex component, homolog (S. cerevisiae) is a protein that in humans is encoded by the RTF1 gene.

This locus may represent a gene involved in regulation of transcription elongation and chromatin remodeling, based on studies of similar proteins in other organisms. The encoded protein may bind single-stranded DNA.

Model organisms

Model organisms have been used in the study of RTF1 function. A conditional knockout mouse line, called Rtf1tm1a(KOMP)Wtsi was generated as part of the International Knockout Mouse Consortium program — a high-throughput mutagenesis project to generate and distribute animal models of disease to interested scientists.

Male and female animals underwent a standardized phenotypic screen to determine the effects of deletion. Twenty four tests were carried out on mutant mice and three significant abnormalities were observed. No homozygous mutant embryos were identified during gestation, and therefore none survived until weaning. The remaining tests were carried out on heterozygous mutant adult mice; vertebral fusion was observed in male animals.

References

Further reading 

Genes mutated in mice